Valda Rose Aveling OBE (16 May 192021 November 2007) was an Australian pianist, harpsichordist and clavichordist.  Her repertoire was very wide, including composers as diverse as William Byrd, Jan Sweelinck, Sergei Rachmaninoff and Béla Bartók.

Valda Aveling was born in Sydney, the youngest of four girls and a boy, and showed great talent at an early age.   At 16 she received teaching and performing diplomas from the NSW Conservatorium of Music, and performed in the Sydney Eisteddfod in 1935 where she won the Sydney Eisteddfod Australian Women's Weekly 100-pound pianoforte scholarship for the most talented juvenile pianist.  She then left for Britain to study harpsichord and clavichord with Violet Gordon-Woodhouse.  She returned in 1938 to make her piano debut under Malcolm Sargent, at the Sydney Town Hall.  In one concert in Manila, she played Tchaikovsky's Piano Concerto No. 1, Rachmaninoff's Piano Concerto No. 2 and Beethoven's Emperor Concerto.  She later came to dislike Beethoven's music, saying there was "nothing light in it".

In 1947 she toured Australia for the Australian Broadcasting Commission but returned to Britain by the early 1950s.  For the next 30 years she appeared at major British festivals such as the Proms, and throughout the Far East, Europe, and North America.

She was active as a harpsichordist before the emergence of the early music movement and commissioned works for the instrument from living composers.  She was the first to give amplified recitals on the clavichord.  She taught at Trinity College of Music, London, and made numerous recordings. Among her notable pupils was pianist Howard Brown.

Among the artists with whom she collaborated were Benjamin Britten, Dame Joan Sutherland, Richard Bonynge, Evelyn Rothwell, Luciano Pavarotti, Leontyne Price, Dame Kiri Te Kanawa and Renata Tebaldi.  She played Bach concertos for two, three or four keyboards, with players such as George Malcolm, Simon Preston, Eileen Joyce and Geoffrey Parsons, and conductors such as Yehudi Menuhin.  She gave a number of premieres, such as new works by Stephen Dodgson and Dame Elizabeth Maconchy.

In 1982, she was appointed an Officer of the Order of the British Empire (OBE).

Valda Aveling never married.  She lived the last ten years of her life being cared for by friends and tending her garden, which contained a large eucalyptus tree imported from Australia. She died at the age of 87.

References

Sources
Obituary, The Age, 27 December 2007, p. 18

1920 births
2007 deaths
Australian classical pianists
Australian women pianists
Australian harpsichordists
British harpsichordists
Clavichordists
Sydney Conservatorium of Music alumni
Australian Officers of the Order of the British Empire
20th-century classical pianists
20th-century Australian musicians
20th-century British musicians
Women harpsichordists
20th-century Australian women
20th-century women pianists